Powers House may refer to:

in Canada
Patrick J. Powers House, 178 James Street, Ottawa, built in 1915, designed by Francis Conroy Sullivan

in the United States
(by state then city or town)
Powers House, in Alvarado Terrace Historic District, Los Angeles, California
Leithoff-Powers Ranch Historic District, Junction City, Kansas, listed on the NRHP in Geary County, Kansas
David W. Powers House, Leavenworth, Kansas, listed on the NRHP in Leavenworth County, Kansas
Peter Powers House, Deer Isle, Maine
Powers House (Sidney, Maine), listed on the NRHP in Hancock County, Maine
Powers Institute Historic District, Bernardston, Massachusetts, NRHP-listed
Edward L. Powers House, Minneapolis, Minnesota, a house designed by Purcell & Elmslie who designed E.S. Hoyt House
Alvis Powers House, Grandin, Missouri, listed on the NRHP in Carter County, Missouri
Windswept Acres-Powers House, Goshen, New Hampshire, NRHP-listed
Powers Home, Troy, New York, NRHP-listed
Isaac M. Powers House, Wallace, North Carolina, listed on the NRHP in Duplin County, North Carolina
Elliot-Powers House and Garage, Fargo, North Dakota, NRHP-eligible
Strange Powers House, Prairie du Chien, Wisconsin, NRHP-listed

See also
Powers Hotel (disambiguation)
Powers Building, Rochester, New York, NRHP-listed
Ira F. Powers Building, Portland, Oregon, listed on the NRHP in Southwest Portland, Oregon
Thomas Powers School